HSF may refer to:

 Hazara Student Federation, in Pakistan
 Heat shock factor, a protein transcription factor
 Heat sink and fan
 Heimler method of Human Social Functioning
 Hellenic Sailing Federation, Greece
 Herbert Smith Freehills, a law firm
 Home Service Force, of the British Army
 Homer Stryker Field, a stadium in Kalamazoo, Michigan, United States
 Houston Shakespeare Festival, Texas, US